Gulfstream Natural Gas Pipeline is a natural gas pipeline that brings gas from Mississippi and Alabama, underwater across the Gulf of Mexico, to Florida.  It was owned by Duke Energy, but is now owned by Enbridge.  Its FERC code is 183.

See also
Florida Gas Transmission Pipeline

References

External links
Gulfstream Natural Gas Spectra Energy Profile
Pipeline Electronic Bulletin Board

Natural gas pipelines in the United States
Enbridge pipelines
Natural gas pipelines in Mississippi
Natural gas pipelines in Alabama
Natural gas pipelines in Florida